Long Branch is a borough in Washington County, Pennsylvania, United States. The population was 421 at the 2020 census.

Geography
Long Branch is located at  (40.091561, -79.882983).

Surrounding neighborhoods
Long Branch has seven borders, including Twilight and Speers to the north, Dunlevy to the northeast, Allenport to the east and south, Elco to the southwest, California to the west, and Fallowfield Township in the northwestern corner.

Demographics

At the 2000 census there were 539 people, 204 households, and 159 families living in the borough. The population density was 162.9 people per square mile (62.9/km2). There were 216 housing units at an average density of 65.3 per square mile (25.2/km2).  The racial makeup of the borough was 97.59% White, 1.67% African American, 0.19% Native American, 0.19% from other races, and 0.37% from two or more races. Hispanic or Latino of any race were 0.37%.

Of the 204 households 26.0% had children under the age of 18 living with them, 69.1% were married couples living together, 6.4% had a female householder with no husband present, and 21.6% were non-families. 19.6% of households were one person and 6.4% were one person aged 65 or older. The average household size was 2.64 and the average family size was 3.03.

The age distribution was 22.3% under the age of 18, 6.1% from 18 to 24, 27.5% from 25 to 44, 27.5% from 45 to 64, and 16.7% 65 or older. The median age was 42 years. For every 100 females, there were 104.9 males. For every 100 females age 18 and over, there were 101.4 males.

The median household income was $35,972 and the median family income  was $40,208. Males had a median income of $40,208 versus $21,250 for females. The per capita income for the borough was $20,936. About 7.7% of families and 10.7% of the population were below the poverty line, including 14.5% of those under age 18 and 6.2% of those age 65 or over.

References

Boroughs in Washington County, Pennsylvania
Populated places established in 1893
Pittsburgh metropolitan area
1893 establishments in Pennsylvania